Toru Shioya (born January 9, 1968) is a former professional basketball Head coach for the Hitachi High-Technologies Cougars of  Women's Japan Basketball League .

External links
Shioya's workout video

References

1968 births
Living people
Akita Isuzu/Isuzu Motors Lynx/Giga Cats players
Japanese basketball coaches
Japanese men's basketball players
Japanese women's basketball coaches
People from Akita (city)
Sportspeople from Akita Prefecture